Edwin H. Hoff (February 5, 1921 – August 9, 2007) was an American politician.

Hoff was born in Virginia, St. Louis County, Minnesota, and graduated from Virginia High School. He lived in Virginia, Minnesota with his wife and family and worked for the Oliver Mining Company as a mechanic. Hoff served on the Virginia City Council and on the St. Louis County Commission. Hoff served in the Minnesota House of Representatives in 1969 and 1970. Hoff died at the Virginia Convalescent Center in Virginia, Minnesota.

References

1921 births
2007 deaths
People from Virginia, Minnesota
County commissioners in Minnesota
Minnesota city council members
Members of the Minnesota House of Representatives